The fictional universe of the Discworld novels by Terry Pratchett features a number of invented games, some of which have gone on to spawn real-world variants.

Stealth chess

Stealth chess is a chess variant, played in the Ankh-Morpork Assassins' Guild, according to The Discworld Companion.

It is similar to normal chess, with the exception of an extra piece and the widening of the board by two specially-colored fields (red and white are described, as opposed to the normal black and white) on either side, known as the Slurks. The extra piece is the assassin (appearing on either side of the rooks in the beginning of the game), the only piece to be able to move in the Slurk.

The assassin moves one square in any direction, and two to capture; however, on exiting the Slurks, the assassin may make as many moves as it has taken within the Slurks and, optionally, a capture move.

An example may clarify: If an assassin enters the Slurks and takes five moves within them (in any direction, including back and forth), it may then appear in any square that is five moves from its original entry point into the Slurk. It is then still able to make a one-square move to capture. If an assassin were to make fifteen moves (the minimum necessary to go from one corner of the normal board to the opposite corner), it could reappear anywhere on the board. The mechanism of moving the assassin up and down the Slurks is used in order to (a) use up a move by the player and (b) to keep count of how many spaces the assassin has moved.

The Slurks are, in essence, a second, "invisible" board, through which only the assassin may travel, and from which it may reemerge on the "visible" board at any time. The assassin may take pieces of its own colour, should this give the player an advantage, but may not take opposing assassins (professional courtesy). Many players consider the assassin to be moving "underneath" the actual board, ready to pop out when they have reached their intended destination.

This makes it a highly powerful piece and a very effective counter to certain strategies depending on specific pieces, and can quickly win the game if one manages to take control of the Slurks and access the king directly. The Discworld Companion notes that players should also take care that they do not focus on the opponent's assassin exclusively to the point that they lose track of what the opponent's other pieces are doing.

The acknowledged master of the game in the books is Lord Havelock Vetinari, Provost of Assassins and Patrician of Ankh-Morpork.

According to the Companion, some Discworld scholars believe that Stealth Chess is the original form of chess in their world; this belief is corroborated by the in-world discovery, in a tomb in Muntab, of a preserved corpse with an 8×10 board embedded in its skull and a pawn hammered up each nostril.

Cripple Mr Onion

Cripple Mr. Onion was originally a fictional card game played by characters in the novels Wyrd Sisters, Reaper Man, Witches Abroad and Lords and Ladies. A game called "Shibo Yangcong-San" ("Cripple Mr Onion" in Chinese) appears in Interesting Times as a tile game played in the Agatean Empire.  This was used by Dr Andrew Millard and Prof. Terry Tao as the basis for an actual card game. The complete rules and design of this game were posted on Usenet around 1993 and were approved by Pratchett himself. It contains elements of blackjack and poker.

The game requires an eight-suited card deck, with suits representing the eight Minor Arcana suits of a Discworld Tarot, or "Caroc" deck: the staves, swords, cups, and coins of real-world Tarot plus four additional suits named for octograms, elephants, terrapins and crowns. For the purposes of flushes, each of the real-world suits is paired with one of the four Discworld suits (a commercially available deck marketed for use in the game includes axes, tridents, roses and doves as suits to be paired, respectively, with the more traditional clubs, spades, hearts and diamonds). For real-world play, two distinctive but identically-backed "normal" decks are generally used, most frequently a traditional "French" deck and an identically-backed Latin-suited deck.

Each player receives a hand of ten cards: five cards are dealt face-down to each player, and the player may then discard up to four of them, receiving new cards to replace them. Then a further five cards are dealt face-up to each player except the dealer, who receives his face-down. The first player begins by assembling their cards into one of the winning groupings described below, and displaying them. The next player must then create a more valuable grouping or fold. If the player is successful in creating a more valuable grouping, the original first player may try again to create an even more valuable grouping for themselves, or fold. This process passes left around the table until only one player remains, who then wins the hand.

The categories of winning group, in ascending order of value, are as follows. Number cards are worth their face value, picture cards are worth ten, and aces are worth one or eleven at the player's choice (as in Blackjack).
Bagel, two cards with values totalling 20;
Two-card Onion, two cards with values totalling 21;
Broken Flush, a set of three or more cards totalling between 16 and 21 inclusive, and with all but one in the same suit-pair;
Three-card Onion, three cards with values totalling 21;
Flush, as a broken flush but with all the cards being in the same suit-pair;
Four-card Onion, as two- and three-card Onion above;
Broken Royal, the combination 678 of any suit;
Five-card Onion;
Royal, the combination 777 of any suit;
Six-card Onion;
Wild Royal, the combination 888 in a hand when eights are wild (see below);
Seven-card Onion;
Double Onion, two picture cards and two aces;
Triple Onion, three picture cards and three aces;
Lesser Onion, four picture cards and four aces;
Great Onion, five picture cards and five aces.

"Modifiers" may also be played to increase the value of a hand. Apart from the crippling rule, modifiers are optional rules, which may or may not be included in a game. The available modifiers (many of which are named after Discworld characters or concepts) are as follows:
Crippling Mr Onion: if a player displays a Great Onion, an opponent may display a nine-card running flush and instantly win the hand. If a player displays a Great or Lesser Onion, an opponent may display a ten-card running flush and instantly win the hand; a player with a ten-card running flush can also use it to steal the win from someone who has previously crippled Mr Onion with a nine-card running flush. (This is the only non-optional modifier.)
Null Eights: in a normal hand, eights may be played as if their value were zero (but can be still be played with value eight if the player wishes). Thus they can be included in an existing Onion in order to improve its size by one card. Whenever this is done, eights become wild cards in the following hand, and this modifier cannot be used in that hand. After one hand with eights as wild cards, they revert to normal, and this modifier becomes available again.
Wild Crippling: when eights are wild, a player cannot Cripple Mr Onion if their running flush contains more wild eights than the Lesser or Great Onion they are trying to cripple.
Octavo: when eights are wild, the grouping 88888888 is considered a Lesser Onion, but beats any other Lesser Onion and is considered a Great Onion for the purpose of being crippled.
The Lady: a player may reveal the Queen of Spades for one of two effects: if eights are not wild in the hand, the player may draw two cards from the deck, then choose one of these cards to replace the queen in their hand. If eights are wild, the player can force every opponent to devalue one ace in their hand to value 1 (rather than 11). The opponent chooses which ace is devalued.
Fate: if the Lady has been played and replaced with another card from the deck as above, the King of Cups may be revealed and replaced in the same way, also rendering all Aces held by the player who played the Lady unplayable. If eights are wild, the King of Cups may be played to immediately cause them to cease being wild; but if played this way, any other (not the same!) player who holds the Queen of Spades may reveal it to cause their eights to remain wild.
Great A'Tuin: a player who reveals the Queen of Coins may subtract eight from the value of one of their cards and add it to the value of another. Card values must still range from 1 to 11.
The Elephants: a player who reveals a set of four cards, each either a nine or ten (or a wild eight), plus the Queen of Coins, may shift points of value between their cards to create a Double Onion, and may consider any other nines or tens in their hands as ones (not aces) and twos respectively. However, any other Double Onion beats this one.
The Sender of Eights: displaying a Jack of Diamonds when eights are not wild causes the aces of any other player who has used a Null Eight to become unplayable. When eights are wild, displaying a Jack of Diamonds makes all aces unplayable and bans wild eights from taking value 1 or 11.
Death: displaying a King of Swords "kills" one picture card in the hand of every player who has more than one in their hand. A "killed" picture card may not participate in a Double Onion, and if eights are wild may not participate in a Triple Onion either, but may still participate in other groupings.
The Archchancellor: When played, the Jack of Staves is wild in all hands. However, any player who plays a Jack of Staves must play all their eights as null eights. Further, any opponent may reveal a King of Swords after the Jack of Staves is revealed to cause the Jack of Staves to cease being wild and also cause all other players to reveal a card they have not yet revealed.
The Fool: If the Jack of Clubs is declared by any player before the first player has played their first group of cards, Bagels and Onions switch places in score value. Thus, Double Bagels, Triple Bagels, etc. become the most valuable hands, with the exception that a Great Onion will still beat a Great Bagel. It also, of course, becomes possible for a player to Cripple Mr Bagel.

Running flush: The cards form an unbroken numeric sequence and are either all the same suit "n card Running Flush" or all but one are of the same suit "n card Running Broken Flush. This is the same as a Straight Flush in poker.

Thud

Thud is a board game devised by Trevor Truran and first published in 2002, inspired by the Discworld novels rather than originating in them. It bears a strong resemblance to the ancient Norse games of Hnefatafl and Tablut but has been changed to be less one-sided. The two sides are dwarfs and trolls.

In the game, the objective is to eliminate as many of the opposition's pieces as possible.  The two antagonists are the trolls and the dwarfs, the trolls being few in number (but individually very powerful), while there are a large number of dwarfs, but each individual dwarf is very weak and requires support from nearby dwarfs to be of use against the trolls. As in fox games, the two sides have different pieces with different movement and attacking styles.

Thud uses an unconventional, octagonal board divided into smaller squares. However, in the televisual adaptation of Going Postal, a Thud board was depicted as resembling a typical square chessboard.

Fictional origins 

The game, supposedly called in Dwarfish "Hnaflbaflwhiflsnifltafl" (a reference to the Viking game Hnefatafl which it resembles), represents the famous "Battle of Koom Valley" between dwarfs and trolls.

The game was first directly referenced in Going Postal, being played by Vetinari, and was a central concept in the following novel Thud!, whose plot was inspired by the game. The release of Thud! in 2005 led to a special Koom Valley edition of the game published by Mongoose Games and featuring a new "Koom Valley" variant inspired by the plot of the novel (see below), and using the book's cover artwork, drawn by Paul Kidby. A third edition, featuring a cloth board and carry bag, was published in 2009. 

Terry Pratchett devised a fictional history of how Thud was invented similar to the Shahnama theory of the origins of chess. In short, the clever dwarf who invented the game was asked by his king to name his reward. The answer was that he wanted his board filled with gold: one small gold piece on the first square, two pieces on the second, four pieces on the third and so on. Upon realised this would equate to more than all the gold on the Disc, the king got angry and threatened to kill the dwarf who was "too drhg'hgin clever by half". The inventor then hastily changed his reward to 'as much gold as he could carry', to which the king agreed before breaking one of his arms.

This story appears in all three editions of the game, and also appears in the collections Once More* with Footnotes (as "The Story of Thud") and A Blink of the Screen (under its original title, "Thud: A Historical Perspective").

Gameplay

The octagonal playing area consists of a 15 by 15 square board from which a triangle of 5 squares in each corner has been removed. The Thudstone is placed on the centre square of the board, where it remains for the entire game and may not be moved onto or through.  The eight trolls are placed onto the eight squares adjacent to the Thudstone and the thirty-two dwarfs are placed so as to occupy all the perimeter spaces except for the four in the same horizontal or vertical line as the Thudstone.  One player takes control of the dwarfs, the other controls the trolls.  The dwarfs move first.

On the dwarfs' turn, they may either move or hurl one dwarf:
 Move: any one dwarf is moved like a chess queen, any number of squares in any orthogonal or diagonal direction, but not onto or through any other piece, whether Thudstone, dwarf, or troll; or
 Hurl: anywhere there is a straight (orthogonal or diagonal) line of adjacent dwarfs on the board, they may hurl the front dwarf in the direction continuing the line, moving it to land on a space containing a troll. The troll is removed from the board and the dwarf takes his place. This may only be done if the endmost dwarf can land on a troll by moving in the direction of the line at most as many spaces as there are dwarfs in the line. Since a single dwarf is a line of one in any direction, a dwarf may always move one space to capture a troll on an immediately adjacent square.

On the trolls' turn, they may either move or shove one troll:
 Move: one troll is moved like a chess king, one square in any orthogonal or diagonal direction onto an empty square. After the troll has been moved, any dwarfs on the eight squares adjacent to the moved troll may optionally be immediately captured and removed from the board, at the troll player's discretion.
 Shove: Anywhere there is a straight (orthogonal or diagonal) line of adjacent trolls on the board, they may shove the endmost troll in the direction continuing the line, up to as many spaces as there are trolls in the line. As in a normal move, the troll may not land on an occupied square, and any dwarfs in the eight squares adjacent to its final position may immediately be captured. Trolls may only make a shove if by doing so they capture at least one dwarf.

The battle is over when both players agree that no more captures can be made by continuing to play, or when one player has no more valid moves to make.  At this point the players count score: the dwarfs score 1 point for each surviving dwarf, and the trolls score 4 for each remaining troll, with the difference being the 'final' score.  The players should then swap sides to play another round, and the sum of their final scores for the two battles determines the overall victor.

Tactics
The basic overall strategy is for the dwarfs to form a large group and for the trolls to try to stop them.

A dwarf's strategy does widely depend on how the trolls are advancing on the dwarf block. A good tactic therefore is to be prepared to sacrifice a few dwarfs to get in the way and slow down any trolls that are advancing into dangerous positions.

Koom Valley Thud

For the 2005 rerelease of Thud, Truran devised a substantially different game that could be played with the same board and pieces, known as Koom Valley Thud. Unlike the original release, in which the publishers attempted to keep the game rules secret so that anyone wishing to play would have to buy the official set, the rules for Koom Valley Thud were posted on the official website so that owners of the original edition would have access to the new rules.

Setup 
There are only sixteen dwarfs in Koom Valley Thud. Fifteen are placed so as to fill two diagonal sides of the board and the orthogonal side between them. The sixteenth is placed next to the Thudstone, called the Rock in this variant, on the dwarfs' side. The eight trolls are arranged in a symmetrical pattern in three groups on the other side.

Objective
For the dwarfs to win, they must move the rock to the far side of the valley – onto any of the five squares on the opposite side of the board against which the dwarf player is sitting. For the trolls to win, they must capture the rock by placing three trolls adjacent to it (in any direction including diagonally). If neither side can achieve their objective, the game is drawn.

Movement
Movement is the same as Classic Thud except that trolls may now move up to 3 spaces in any direction (horizontal, vertical or diagonal).

Dwarfs may move the Rock instead of moving a dwarf piece. It may move only one square in any direction. To be moved it must be next to a dwarf and it must also be next to a dwarf at the end of its move.

Captures
A troll captures a dwarf by trampling over it. It moves in a straight line from a square next to the dwarf, through the square the dwarf is on and lands on the empty square immediately beyond. The trampled dwarf is removed from the board.

Several captures may be made in one move and a change of direction is allowed between captures.

Dwarfs capture a troll by moving a dwarf so that the troll is trapped between two dwarfs in any straight line (including diagonally). The three pieces, two dwarfs and a troll, must all be in line.

If the dwarf that has been moved also traps another troll between itself and another dwarf, that troll is also captured.

Captures are only made when the capturing side moves a piece. The rock may be moved and come to rest next to three trolls. It can only be captured when a troll is moved.

See also

 Discworld: Ankh-Morpork
 List of games with concealed rules

External links
Cripple Mr Onion
The Fat Pack Playing Card Company An eight-suit pack of cards suitable for playing the game
The full rules of Cripple Mr Onion
A play-against-your-computer version is available at http://www.davebudd.org.uk/cmo/index.html (Note from program author: 1. The program is embarrassingly poor, and 2. I've lost the source, so don't ask!)
Thud
 Official site, including Pratchett's Story of Thud
 Photograph of an official board at BoardGameGeek.  This illustrates both what the official game set looks like, and the initial positions.
 
 ThudBoard by Marc Boeren, software for playing Thud; this software only replicates a board and the pieces, it does not provide a computer-opponent.
 Thud! Zillions of Games implementation.

References

 
Fictional games